Preseli Pembrokeshire is a constituency of the Senedd. It elects one Member of the Senedd by the first past the post method of election. It is also one of eight constituencies in the Mid and West Wales electoral region, which elects four additional members, in addition to eight constituency members, to produce a degree of proportional representation for the region as a whole.

Boundaries

1999 to 2007 
The constituency was created for the first election to the Assembly, in 1999, with the name and boundaries of the Preseli Pembrokeshire Westminster constituency. It is a Dyfed constituency, one of five constituencies covering, and entirely within, the preserved county of Dyfed.

The other four Dyfed constituencies are Carmarthen West and South Pembrokeshire, Carmarthen East and Dinefwr, Ceredigion and Llanelli. They are all within the Mid and West Wales electoral region.

The region consisted of the eight constituencies of Brecon and Radnorshire, Carmarthen East and Dinefwr, Carmarthen West and South Pembrokeshire, Ceredigion, Llanelli, Meirionnydd Nant Conwy, Montgomeryshire and Preseli Pembrokeshire.

From 2007 
Boundaries changed at the 2007 Assembly election. Preseli Pembrokeshire remained one of five Dyfed constituencies and one of eight constituencies in the Mid and West Wales region. 
However, boundaries within Dyfed have changed to realign them with local government ward boundaries and to reduce disparities in the sizes of constituency electorates, and the boundaries of the region changed, to align them with the boundaries of preserved counties.

The other four Dyfed constituencies remain Carmarthen West and South Pembrokeshire, Carmarthen East and Dinefwr, Ceredigion and Llanelli. They are all within the Mid and West Wales electoral region.

The region consists of the constituencies of Brecon and Radnorshire, Carmarthen East and Dinefwr, Carmarthen West and South Pembrokeshire, Ceredigion, Dwyfor Meirionnydd, Llanelli, Montgomeryshire and Preseli Pembrokeshire.

For Westminster purposes, the same new constituency boundaries became effective for the National General Election in 2010.

Voting 
In general elections for the National Assembly for Wales, each voter has two votes. The first vote may be used to vote for a candidate to become the Assembly Member for the voter's constituency, elected by the first past the post system. The second vote may be used to vote for a regional closed party list of candidates. Additional member seats are allocated from the lists by the d'Hondt method, with constituency results being taken into account in the allocation.

Assembly Members and Members of the Senedd

Elections

Elections in the 2020s

Elections in the 2010s 

Regional ballots rejected: 203

Elections in the 2000s 

2003 Electorate: 55,195
Regional ballots rejected: 313

Elections in the 1990s

References 

Senedd constituencies in the Mid and West Wales electoral region
1999 establishments in Wales
Constituencies established in 1999